Originally produced by Minolta, and currently produced by Sony, the 50mm 1.4 is a normal wide-aperture prime photographic lens compatible with cameras using the Minolta AF and Sony α lens mounts.

See also
 List of Minolta A-mount lenses

Sources
Dyxum lens data and reviews

External links
Sony: SAL-50F14: 50mm F1.4 fixed lens

50
Camera lenses introduced in 1985